The James Bond film series from Eon Productions has featured numerous musical compositions since its inception 1962, many of which are now considered classic pieces of British film music. The best known of these pieces is the "James Bond Theme" by Monty Norman. Other instrumentals, such as "On Her Majesty's Secret Service", and various songs performed by several notable British or American artists such as Shirley Bassey's "Goldfinger", Nancy Sinatra's "You Only Live Twice", Paul McCartney's "Live and Let Die", Carly Simon's "Nobody Does It Better", Sheena Easton's "For Your Eyes Only", Duran Duran's "A View to a Kill", Tina Turner's "GoldenEye" also become identified with the series; Madonna's "Die Another Day" became a dance hit around the world, while A View to a Kill becomes the first and only James Bond song to have reached number one on the US Billboard Hot 100. Three Bond songs have won the Academy Award for Best Original Song: "Skyfall" by Adele, "Writing's on the Wall" by Sam Smith and "No Time to Die" by Billie Eilish, with Writing's on the Wall also became the first Bond theme to reach number one on the UK Singles Chart.

"James Bond Theme"

The "James Bond Theme" is the main signature theme of the James Bond films and has featured in every Eon Productions Bond film since Dr. No, released in 1962. The piece has been used as an accompanying fanfare to the gun barrel sequence in every Eon Bond film before Casino Royale.

"James Bond Is Back"
The briefest of "James Bond themes", this composition started off the "Opening Titles" music of From Russia with Love. It was heard in the On Her Majesty's Secret Service film trailer.
 WLS (AM) used the theme in the mid-1960s for their secret agent radio serial "The Wild Adventures of Peter Fugitive" that appeared on "The Art Roberts Show".

"007 Theme"

"007 Theme", not to be confused with the "James Bond Theme", is an adventure theme composed by John Barry in 1963 for the Bond film From Russia with Love.
"The John Barry Seven" had pop chart hit with a cover version of Elmer Bernstein's theme to The Magnificent Seven that included seven beats repeated throughout the theme. Barry used seven beats throughout the "007 Theme".

It became a secondary theme for the Bond films, being used throughout the series, primarily during action scenes. Its most notable appearances are:
 From Russia with Love – played during the gypsy camp gunfight and also during Bond's theft of the Lektor decoder from the Russian embassy in Istanbul.
 Thunderball – played briefly in a climactic underwater fight; a similar but different theme of seven beats is played when Bond runs from SPECTRE during a parade and during the climax.
 You Only Live Twice – played during the flight of "Little Nellie" before Bond battles four helicopters that attack him.
 Diamonds Are Forever – played during Bond's destruction of Blofeld's Headquarters.
 Moonraker – played during the Amazon River chase.

The theme has not been used in its entirety in a Bond film since its use in Moonraker.

This piece of music was also used by Al Primo, the news director at KYW-TV in Philadelphia for its long-time theme to Eyewitness News, and was adopted by other Group W stations in Baltimore, Pittsburgh, Boston and San Francisco as well as other non-Group W stations, including WLS-TV in Chicago. The theme was also sampled by Big Audio Dynamite for the 1986 song "Sightsee M.C!"

"Suspense" motif
Like John Barry, David Arnold has left his own mark in the music of James Bond. In this case, he has established what can be called the "suspense motif", which is a descending, often repetitive four-note motif that can be heard in all of the Bond films he has scored. This motif can be heard in:
 Tomorrow Never Dies – "Station Break", "*-3-Send", "Underwater Discovery"
 The World Is Not Enough – "Pipeline", "Remember Pleasure", "Torture Queen", "Submarine"
 Die Another Day – "Death of Moon", "Iced Inc", "Antonov"
 Casino Royale – "Miami International", "Dirty Martini", and very briefly in "African Rundown"
 Quantum of Solace – briefly in "Time to Get Out", and twice in "Perla de las dunas"

Composers (Eon Productions)
The largest contributions to the Bond films, save for the "James Bond Theme", are works from John Barry. Barry composed eleven Bond soundtracks and is credited with the creation of "007" (dominated by brass and percussion) and the popular orchestral theme from On Her Majesty's Secret Service.

Next to Barry, David Arnold is the series' most regular composer. He composed the scores for five Bond films: Tomorrow Never Dies through Quantum of Solace. His orchestrations combined with electronic rhythm elements gave the Pierce Brosnan era its musical identity. Arnold was essentially Barry's anointed successor, Barry having recommended Arnold to Barbara Broccoli when she took over the Bond films from her father Albert R. Broccoli.

Other major composers and record-producers include George Martin, Bill Conti, Michael Kamen, Marvin Hamlisch, Éric Serra, Thomas Newman and Hans Zimmer. Each of these composed for only one Bond film, with the exception of Newman. The departures from John Barry had various causes; sometimes Barry declined in order to avoid paying double income tax—US and UK. Barry died in 2011. Sometimes the director of a Bond film had worked with the composer of his choice on other films – the latter happened to David Arnold with Skyfall and Spectre.

Music from Eon Productions

Title themes
The "James Bond Theme" is the main theme for Dr. No, and has featured in all the Eon Productions Bond films in different versions. The theme has also featured on the gun barrel sequences at the beginning of the films. The original theme was written by Monty Norman, and was performed by John Barry and his orchestra in 1962. In the opening credits of Dr. No, two other pieces were played: an untitled bongo interlude and a Calypso-flavored rendition of "Three Blind Mice", titled "Kingston Calypso". Due to this, Dr. No is the only film to have more than one opening theme. The "James Bond Theme" reached  13 in the UK Singles Chart, and remained in the charts for 13 weeks.

The opening credits of From Russia with Love were accompanied by an instrumental version of the main theme, arranged by John Barry and written by Lionel Bart. A single by The John Barry Orchestra reached  39 in the U.K. At the film's end, a vocal version by English singer Matt Monro is heard. This song spent 13 weeks in the U.K. charts, peaking at  20.

Goldfinger was the third soundtrack composed by John Barry, and this time the theme song had lyrics written by Anthony Newley and Leslie Bricusse. The soundtrack reached  1 on the Billboard 200 and spent 70 weeks on the charts. It also peaked at  14 on the UK Albums Chart, and received the Bond series first Grammy Award nomination, Best Original Score from a Motion Picture or Television Show.

Welsh singer Shirley Bassey is the only singer to perform more than one Bond theme – she recorded the themes to Goldfinger, Diamonds Are Forever, and Moonraker. Bassey also recorded her own versions of "Mr. Kiss Kiss Bang Bang" for Thunderball and it was rumoured that "No Good About Goodbye" was intended for Quantum of Solace, however David Arnold said 'No Good About Goodbye' was never intended as a Bond song.

Paul McCartney's performance of "Live and Let Die" was the first Bond theme song to be nominated for an Academy Award for Best Original Song; it reached  2 as a U.S. single, and  9 on the U.K. charts. George Martin's work in the song won the Grammy for Best Arrangement Accompanying Vocalists.

Marvin Hamlisch's (music) and Carole Bayer Sager's (lyrics) "Nobody Does It Better" (performed by Carly Simon) received a nomination for the Academy Award for Best Original Song, as did Bill Conti's "For Your Eyes Only", which was performed by Sheena Easton.

It was not until the 2013 Oscars that a Bond theme song finally won the Academy Award for Best Original Song, the theme song from Skyfall by Adele. Thomas Newman's score also got the first nomination for Academy Award for Best Original Score in the series since Hamlisch's own for The Spy Who Loved Me, while winning the Grammy for Best Score Soundtrack for Visual Media. Adele's song also won the Grammy Award for Best Song Written for Visual Media. Sam Smith's "Writing's on the Wall" from Spectre and Billie Eilish's "No Time to Die" from the film of the same name would also win Oscars for Best Original Song.

Duran Duran and John Barry's "A View To A Kill" topped the singles charts in the U.S. Billboard Hot 100, the only Bond theme to hit  1 in the United States. No James Bond theme had topped the charts in the UK until Sam Smith's "Writing's on the Wall" entered the charts at number one on 2 October 2015.

Several of the later films have alternative theme songs, often during the closing credits. The Living Daylights featured The Pretenders performing "If There Was a Man," composed by John Barry with Chrissie Hynde. Licence to Kill has "If You Asked Me To" sung by Patti LaBelle. GoldenEye featured Éric Serra's "The Experience of Love". Tomorrow Never Dies included k.d. lang's "Surrender" during the closing credits, a song which was originally proposed by composer David Arnold to be the title sequence theme instead of the Sheryl Crow title song. The "Surrender" theme is heard throughout the score while the melody of Sheryl Crow's song is not used again during the film. This hearkens back to the Thunderball soundtrack, where "Mr. Kiss Kiss Bang Bang" was originally proposed as the opening credits music, only to be replaced by the eponymous title track as sung by Tom Jones.

On Her Majesty's Secret Service featured an instrumental theme tune, something which remains unique amongst the post–From Russia with Love films, and included a vocal theme in the form of Louis Armstrong's performance of "We Have All the Time in the World", written by John Barry and Hal David.

 A song titled "Mr. Kiss Kiss Bang Bang" sung by Shirley Bassey was originally slated to be the theme song of Thunderball. It was re-recorded by Dionne Warwick, but Albert Broccoli insisted the theme song must include the film's title and also decided that the lyrics should not start before the film's title Thunderball appears on-screen. A new song was composed and recorded at the eleventh hour titled "Thunderball", performed by Tom Jones. The melody of "Mr. Kiss Kiss Bang Bang" remains a major component of the film score.
 The songs "All Time High" (Octopussy), "You Know My Name" (Casino Royale), "Another Way to Die" (Quantum of Solace) and "Writing's on the Wall" (Spectre) do not feature the title of its film either in the song title or lyrics (although "Another Way to Die" features the word "solace" in the second stanza). While not named after the film, "Nobody Does It Better" does feature the line "the spy who loved me" in its lyrics.
 "You Know My Name", "Skyfall", and "Writing's on the Wall" do not appear on their respective films' soundtrack albums, having been released as standalone singles instead.
 "No Time to Die" was released in February 2020 when the movie was scheduled to be released in April 2020. The movie release was delayed during the COVID-19 pandemic to Fall of 2021.

Secondary songs
A number of Bond films include one (or more) additional songs in the soundtrack. Some of these pieces of music, such as "We Have All the Time in the World" by Louis Armstrong, have gone on to become as well known as the main themes, while other songs remain exclusively linked to the film in which they appear.

 Dionne Warwick's performance of "Mr. Kiss Kiss Bang Bang" is never actually heard in Thunderball; it was originally intended to have been the opening credits theme, but this was changed when Albert Broccoli decreed the theme had to include the film's title. The melody of "Mr. Kiss Kiss Bang Bang" is heard throughout the film; Warwick's version was finally released in the 1990s.
 The original end title theme to The World Is Not Enough was "Only Myself to Blame", composed by David Arnold and Don Black, and sung by Scott Walker, but was left out of the final film and replaced by an Arnold arrangement of the "James Bond Theme". "Blame" was, however, left on The World Is Not Enough soundtrack album, and its melody, representing the Elektra King character, appears throughout The World Is Not Enough score, most prominently in the tracks "Casino" and "Elektra's Theme".
 Matt Monro's vocal rendition of "From Russia with Love" is often considered the official theme song for that film, even though the opening credits use an instrumental version that also incorporates the "James Bond Theme". Monro's version isn't heard until about 15 minutes into the film over a radio as source music, and again over the closing titles.

Foreign songs
Some songs have been dubbed for the foreign versions of the films.

 "Goldfinger" was sung in Spanish by Karina (María Isabel Llaudes Santiago), a French version was sung by both John William and Catherine Elia and an Italian version was recorded by Vanna Scotti.
 "Feuerball" sung by Alan Corb was, in 1965, the German Cover version of "Thunderball" (sung by Tom Jones). The B-side of the single contained a German version, also sung by Alan Corb, of "Mr. Kiss Kiss Bang Bang" with that title, creating the bizarre situation that a vocal 'cover' version of the song was published before the original vocal version(s) (sung by both by Shirley Bassey and Dionne Warwick), which were both published in the early 1990s with The Best of James Bond 30th Anniversary and 30th Anniversary Limited Edition albums.
 "Man Lebt Nur Zweimal" sung by Gissy André was, in 1967, the German Cover version of "You Only Live Twice" (sung by Nancy Sinatra). 
 "Tu vivras deux fois" sung by Lucky Blondo was, in 1967, the French Cover version of "You Only Live Twice" (sung by Nancy Sinatra). 
 "In Deinen Augen", sung by Sollie Nero, was, in 1981, the German Cover version of "For Your Eyes Only" (sung by Sheena Easton).

Additional music

Non-Eon Productions songs

Main title themes

 The closing credits of Casino Royale use a vocal version of "Casino Royale" sung by Mike Redway, who remained uncredited until the release of the 2012 '45th anniversary' edition of the soundtrack.

Secondary songs

 The soundtrack to the 1967 spoof Casino Royale also included two short comedic songs sung in a 1920s style. One led into an instrumental version of "The Look of Love" and began with the line "James Bond playing at Casino Royale..."; later, this tune was reprised as "Seven James Bonds at Casino Royale", which leads into a lyrical version of the theme sung by Mike Redway that played over the closing credits.
 "The Look of Love" was the first song from any Bond film to be nominated for the Academy Award for Best Original Song, six years before the first nomination from an Eon Bond film. It remains the only song from a non-Eon Bond film so nominated.

Unused songs
A number of songs have been recorded for Bond films but not used.

 "Mr. Kiss Kiss Bang Bang" by Dionne Warwick and Shirley Bassey was written for Thunderball. Its title refers to a nickname given to Bond by an Italian journalist in 1962. Warwick and Bassey both recorded versions, but halfway through the scoring process, producer Albert Broccoli decided that the film's title must appear in the lyrics, so "Thunderball" was commissioned. The song's melody still plays a prominent role in the score and both singers' versions have appeared on compilations in the 1990s.
 "Thunderball" by Johnny Cash
 "Run James Run" by Brian Wilson, intended as a Bond theme, but ultimately released as the eponymous track on the Beach Boys' album Pet Sounds.
 "You Only Live Twice" by Julie Rogers is included on the 30th-anniversary release of The Best of James Bond.
 "You Only Live Twice" by Lorraine Chandler appears on R(are) C(ollectable) A(nd Soulful) Volume 2.
 "The Man with the Golden Gun" by Alice Cooper appears on their 1973 album Muscle of Love
 "For Your Eyes Only" by Blondie appears on their 1982 album The Hunter.
 "Never Say Never Again" by Phyllis Hyman was intended for Never Say Never Again.
 "The Living Daylights" by Pet Shop Boys was adapted from a demo theme for The Living Daylights, later reworked as "This Must Be the Place I Waited Years to Leave". It appears on their 1990 album Behaviour.<ref>{{cite web|author=Jude Rogers | author-link = Jude Rogers |url=https://www.theguardian.com/music/2008/oct/31/james-bond-songs |title=For your ears only | Music | The |publisher=Guardian |date=2008-10-30 |access-date=2014-12-11}}</ref>
 "The Juvenile" by Ace of Base was originally written in 1995 as "The Goldeneye", then rewritten as "The Juvenile" and released in 2002 on Da Capo.
 "Tomorrow Never Lies" by Pulp, originally titled "Tomorrow Never Dies", was released as a B-side on their 1997 single "Help the Aged", and on the vinyl version of their 1998 album This Is Hardcore.
 "Tomorrow Never Dies" by Saint Etienne appears on their Built on Sand album. The liner notes state that Pierce Brosnan kept the master tape of the song. Other artists who submitted Tomorrow Never Dies themes include Marc Almond, Swan Lee, the Cardigans and Space.
 "Man of War" was written by the English band Radiohead in the 1990s. It was submitted for Spectre, but was rejected as it had not been written for the film, making it ineligible for an Academy Award for Best Original Song. Radiohead wrote another song for the film, "Spectre", but it was rejected as too melancholy.

Cover versions and spin-offs
Bond music has inspired a number of cover albums in a variety of genres, including the 2007 album Mister Bond – A Jazzy Cocktail of Ice Cold Themes (lounge) and Shaken and Stirred: The David Arnold James Bond Project, the latter of which features David Arnold collaborating with several contemporary artists. The City of Prague Philharmonic Orchestra recorded several albums with Bond music and performs in premieres and special events of Bond films. Britain's Royal Philharmonic Orchestra released an album of several Bond songs performances called Best Of James Bond, some of which were used on the menus of "Ultimate Edition" DVD releases. Billy Strange released "Secret Agent File" in 1965. In 2004, The Cavaliers played a show titled 007 using Bond music such as "GoldenEye", "For Your Eyes Only", "Live and Let Die", "Hovercraft Chase", "Welcome to Cuba" and "Paris and Bond". Some of them are Italo disco-like rhythms and soundtrack albums promote hits that matches the film's theme. In 2000 'An Electronika Tribute to James Bond' album was released adding yet another genre to the Bond fandom.

Video games
With the increase in audio quality for video game consoles and personal computers, in addition to the continued popularity of computer and video games, publisher Electronic Arts as well as Activision (since 2008) has included opening themes and film-style credit sequences to some of its more recent Bond video game spin offs.

Novels
The 2008 continuation novel Devil May Care'' by Sebastian Faulks was the first James Bond novel to receive its own theme song. Also called "Devil May Care", the song was written and recorded by Cardiff band SAL and was available on the UK audiobook release of the novel.

See also
 Outline of James Bond

References

External links
 montynorman.com
 Detailed account of a court proceeding between Monty Norman and John Barry re: The "James Bond Theme", including musicological breakdowns of the theme itself.

 
Music
Music by media franchise